Events from the year 1574 in Ireland.

Incumbent
Monarch: Elizabeth I

Events
May 8 – Brian O'Neill of Clandeboye, having submitted to the Earl of Essex, begs Elizabeth I of England for mercy.
July 18 – the Geraldine chiefs sign the Combination, promising to support Gerald FitzGerald, 15th Earl of Desmond, unconditionally.
September 2 – Desmond submits to William FitzWilliam (Lord Deputy) at Cork following a month's campaign in Munster during which his castle at Derinlaur has been taken.
September – Essex campaigns against Turlough Luineach O'Neill.
November
 Essex meets Brian O'Neill of Clandeboye at his castle of Edendubhcarrig (County Antrim) where at least 200 of the clan O'Neill are treacherously massacred at a feast while O'Neill himself, his wife and brother are captured, taken to Dublin, executed and quartered. The Lordship of Clandeboye is partitioned in three by the English.
 The rebel Rory O'More is briefly imprisoned.
November 5 – Edmund Tanner (d. 1579 in Ireland) is appointed Roman Catholic Bishop of Cork and Cloyne and consecrated in Rome.

Births
Thomas Fitzmaurice, 18th Baron Kerry, soldier (d. 1630)
Stephen White, Jesuit scholar (d. 1646)

Deaths
November – Brian O'Neill of Clandeboye, clan chieftain

References

1570s in Ireland
Years of the 16th century in Ireland